This is a list of Maldivian films released in 2006.

Releases

Feature film

Television
This is a list of Maldivian series, in which the first episode was aired or streamed in 2006.

Short film

See also
 Lists of Maldivian films

References 

Maldivian
2006